Markus Keller (born 21 April 1967) is a retired male athlete from Switzerland, who competed in triathlon. Keller competed at the first Olympic triathlon at the 2000 Summer Olympics. He took eighteenth place with a total time of 1:50:15.25.

References
sports-reference

External links

1967 births
Living people
Swiss male triathletes
Triathletes at the 2000 Summer Olympics
Olympic triathletes of Switzerland
Place of birth missing (living people)
21st-century Swiss people